Bathypera is a genus of ascidian tunicates in the family Pyuridae.

Species within the genus Bathypera include:
 Bathypera feminalba Young & Vazquez, 1995 
 Bathypera goreaui Millar & Goodbody, 1974 
 Bathypera hastaefera Vinogradova, 1962 
 Bathypera ovoida (Ritter, 1907) 
 Bathypera splendens (Michaelsen, 1904)

References

Stolidobranchia
Tunicate genera